Precious is the self-titled debut and only studio album by UK girl group Precious. It spawned four singles: "Say It Again", Rewind, "It's Gonna Be My Way", and "New Beginning". It was released on 20 November 2000.

Track listing

References

2000 debut albums
Precious (band) albums
EMI Records albums
Albums produced by Cutfather